John Baird (26 May 1906 – 21 March 1965) was a British dental surgeon and  Labour Party politician.

Born in Glasgow, he was the son of Alexander and Mary Baird. After leaving school he worked initially as a coalminer, before attending St. Mungo's Medical School to study dentistry. He qualified in 1929, and was admitted to the Royal Faculty Physicians and Surgeons. In 1933 he married Agnes Kerr of Castle Douglas, and the couple had 2 children.

In 1928 Baird become active in Labour politics in Glasgow. He continued to be a member of the Labour Party when he moved his dental practice firstly to the north of England and then later to the London area.  With the outbreak of the Second World War in 1939 Baird joined the Army Dental Corps, reaching the rank of captain by the war's end.

He was first elected to the House of Commons in the Labour landslide at the 1945 general election, when he defeated the long-serving Liberal MP, Geoffrey Mander.

When his constituency was abolished for the 1950 general election, Baird was returned to Parliament for the new Wolverhampton North East.  He held that seat until he stepped down at the 1964 general election.

In parliament he took an interest in health and social insurance issues. He was a strong opponent of racism, and also sought to form better relations with Communist countries, visiting the Soviet Union and People's Republic of China on a number of occasions.

According to John Callaghan, Baird should be "counted as the first Trotskyist MP" for assistance he gave to the second Revolutionary Socialist League, later better known as Militant.  Pierre Frank commented that he "was always on our side."

Baird died in a London hospital in 1965, aged 58.

References

External links 
 

1906 births
1965 deaths
Labour Party (UK) MPs for English constituencies
UK MPs 1950–1951
UK MPs 1951–1955
UK MPs 1955–1959
UK MPs 1959–1964
Alumni of the University of Glasgow
Politicians from Glasgow
Scottish dentists
20th-century British medical doctors
Royal Army Dental Corps officers
20th-century dentists